SeaWorld Ohio was a theme park and marine zoological park, located in Aurora, Ohio. It was owned and operated by SeaWorld Parks & Entertainment, formerly known as Busch Entertainment Corporation. The Ohio location was the second SeaWorld park to be built in the chain, following SeaWorld San Diego which opened just six years earlier. The park was developed by George Millay, founder of the SeaWorld brand. Wildwater Kingdom, a waterpark built by Cedar Fair in 2005, occupied the property until its closure in September 5, 2016.

History

SeaWorld Cleveland (1970–2000)

In 1966, Earl Gascoigne, marketing director at Cedar Point in Sandusky, Ohio, was impressed by the success of SeaWorld San Diego and eager to form a partnership with the park's founder, George Millay. Gascoigne spoke with Millay about building a second park near the Ohio amusement park. Millay was uncomfortable with the location and sales agreement, and declined to build there. Two years later, Millay and his team were looking to expand their brand eastward. The company was looking for a location between Detroit and Pittsburgh, as the land spanning between the two cities was the largest and highest-paid blue-collar population in the United States.

Earl Gascoigne had recently left Cedar Point to redevelop Geauga Lake, a struggling amusement park near Cleveland, with his colleague and friend Gasper Lococo. The men were searching for a way to increase attendance and revenue at Geauga Lake other than simply adding new attractions. Gascoigne took the opportunity to reconnect with George Millay. Now working with Funtime Inc., Earl Gascoigne convinced Millay to build the second SeaWorld park adjacent to Geauga Lake. The Ohio SeaWorld project was announced in 1968.

SeaWorld Cleveland, originally referred to as Sea World of Ohio in 1969, opened to the public on May 29, 1970, after nearly two years of planning and construction. Located approximately 20 miles southeast of Cleveland, in the Western Reserve city of Aurora, Ohio, the 25-acre marine park welcomed over 5,500 guests on its opening day. The oceanarium cost $5.5 million to build, but greatly exceeded the expectations of Millay and his team. In its first 100-day season, SeaWorld Cleveland doubled attendance predictions as more than 1.1 million people visited the park in 1970.

The marine park was beautifully landscaped, boasting hundreds of interesting trees and shrubs providing a rich backdrop and winning national awards. By the year 2000, SeaWorld Cleveland had grown to occupy 232 acres, but was restricted from adding roller coasters or water rides due to a non-compete clause with neighboring Geauga Lake.

SeaWorld Cleveland was followed by SeaWorld Orlando in 1973, and SeaWorld San Antonio in 1988. SeaWorld Abu Dhabi will be the fifth SeaWorld park built, scheduled to open in 2022.

Six Flags Worlds of Adventure (2001–2003)

Six Flags announced that it had reached an agreement to purchase SeaWorld Cleveland from Busch Entertainment Corporation on January 10, 2001, for $110 million. Six Flags combined the marine life park with the 520-acre Six Flags Ohio (Geauga Lake) along with their nearby campground and hotel properties. Busch Entertainment spokesman Fred Jacobs stated that the northern climate had no influence on the sale. The park was ultimately sold due to a competitive restriction clause with Geauga Lake that limited the growth of SeaWorld Cleveland under Busch Entertainment ownership.

Beginning in 2001, the park was named Six Flags Worlds of Adventure, boasting 750 acres. The property was divided into three sections—Wild Life, the former SeaWorld park; Wild Rides, formerly Geauga Lake; and Wild Slides, a 10-acre water park—all included in a single gate price. The sale of SeaWorld Cleveland did not include the killer whales or the park's dolphins. The killer whale show was replaced by three dolphins from Six Flags Discovery Kingdom until a new killer whale, Shouka, arrived on loan from a park in France. Along with new animal exhibits, Six Flags added two family rides and a Batman-themed water ski show. Six Flags president Gary Story announced that a five-year plan for the Ohio park included submarine, volcano, and rain forest attractions, as well as a monorail system for transportation.

Six Flags Ohio reported record attendance in 2000, reaching 1.7 million guests. After joining the parks as Worlds of Adventure in 2001, attendance jumped to 2.7 million visitors, but shy of the anticipated 3 million by park officials.

Geauga Lake & Wildwater Kingdom (2005–2007)

On March 10, 2004, Cedar Fair, the owner and operator of Cedar Point in Sandusky, Ohio, announced that they would be acquiring the entire Six Flags Worlds of Adventure property. Cedar Fair purchased all 750 acres for $145 million, but Six Flags would retain ownership of the park's animals. Six Flags stated that the sale of the Ohio property would allow them to pay down debt and pursue other opportunities in North America.

Beginning in 2004, the park opened without the animal attractions and much of the former SeaWorld property was restricted from guest access. Cedar Fair had reinstituted the park's original Geauga Lake name for the 2004 season. Along with the removal of the animals and demolition of animal attractions (as Cedar Fair does not specialize in animal entertainment or exhibitions), Cedar Fair was also forced to strip the park of all Six Flags branding, including DC Comics and Looney Tunes theming, as licensing rights were not included in the sale (also, neither the licensing rights for Looney Tunes nor DC Comics are owned by Cedar Fair).

Opening on June 17, 2005, Wildwater Kingdom would occupy 17 acres of the former SeaWorld Cleveland site. The addition of the waterpark saw the entire property being renamed Geauga Lake & Wildwater Kingdom for the 2005 season onward. A second phase to the waterpark was planned for 2006, including a wave pool, body slides, whirl pool, and swim-up bar, totaling $24 million for the two-year project and covering 20 acres. However, the expansion was scaled back; ultimately a 30,000-square-foot wave pool was added in 2006 at the cost of $5 million. The addition of Wildwater Kingdom was an attempt by Cedar Fair to offset the loss of animal attractions. Many of the structures in the marine life section of the park were demolished or refurbished to complement the new waterpark.

Attendance at Geauga Lake under Cedar Fair ownership dropped 74 percent from 2.7 million in 2001 to 700,000 in 2004. Attendance remained at 700,000 through the 2006 season. After the 2006 season, Cedar Fair removed three attractions, including the X-Flight and Steel Venom roller coasters and Bel-Aire Express monorail, as well as shortening the operating season to 101 days and discontinuing Halloween events.

Wildwater Kingdom (2008–2016)

On September 21, 2007, Cedar Fair announced in a press release that the Aurora, Ohio, amusement park would become exclusively a waterpark for the 2008 season. Dick Kinzel, chairman, president and chief executive officer of Cedar Fair at the time, stated that Wildwater Kingdom was the attraction's most popular attribute. The company reported that the stand-alone waterpark is a better fit for the area and that they hope to draw a more local crowd.

Cedar Fair announced on August 19, 2016, that Wildwater Kingdom would not reopen for the 2017 season. The waterpark closed permanently on September 5, 2016 after eleven years in business. Demolition occurred in November 2017. In August 2020, ground was broken for a mixed-used development featuring 308 residential units, 20 acres of commercial space, and 98 acres of park land.

Attractions
SeaWorld Cleveland had various attractions, including rides, exhibits, and live shows.

Rides and attractions
When SeaWorld acquired the Aurora property in 1970, the company agreed to a competitive restriction with Geauga Lake, which prevented them from adding roller coasters or water rides. Honoring the no-compete clause, Geauga Lake was restricted from adding animal attractions, while SeaWorld was limited to theaters and motion-based attractions. Instead of rides, there were several different playgrounds located within the park.

Exhibits
The marine life park included many animal and cultural exhibits.

Dining
SeaWorld Cleveland offered a wide variety of shopping and dining. Gift shops within the park held thousands of items from all over the world. Food locations served meals such as Whaleburgers along with fish and chips. The park also featured Polynesian dining. Snack stands sold popcorn, soft pretzels, ice cream, and soft drinks.

Venues
Several stadiums, theaters, and event pavilions made up the 50-acre theme park.

Incidents
An 18-foot motorboat wrecked into the ski stadium audience of 4,000 people on August 17, 1996, injuring 22 people. Those injured aged from 2 to 78, and four were in critical condition. The boat was a part of the Baywatch Ski Show and crashed after a mechanical failure.

References

Defunct amusement parks in Ohio
Buildings and structures in Portage County, Ohio
Tourist attractions in Portage County, Ohio
Buildings and structures in Geauga County, Ohio
Tourist attractions in Geauga County, Ohio
Amusement parks in Ohio
1970 establishments in Ohio
Former zoos
Zoos in Ohio
SeaWorld Parks & Entertainment
2000 disestablishments in Ohio
Amusement parks opened in 1970
Amusement parks closed in 2000
Aurora, Ohio
Zoos established in 1970
Zoos disestablished in 2000